Marjut Rolig (née Lukkarinen; born 4 February 1966 in Lohja) is a Finnish former cross-country skier who competed during the early 1990s. She won two medals at the 1992 Winter Olympics in Albertville with a gold in the 5 km and a silver in the 15 km.

Rolig also won a bronze in the 15 km at the 1993 FIS Nordic World Ski Championships as well. She also won an FIS Race at 5 km in Finland in 1993.

Cross-country skiing results
All results are sourced from the International Ski Federation (FIS).

Olympic Games
 2 medals – (1 gold, 1 silver)

World Championships
 1 medal – (1 bronze)

World Cup

Season standings

Individual podiums
 1 victory 
 5 podiums

Team podiums
 3 podiums 

Note:  Until the 1999 World Championships and the 1994 Olympics, World Championship and Olympic races were included in the World Cup scoring system.

References

External links
 

Finnish female cross-country skiers
1966 births
Living people
People from Lohja
Cross-country skiers at the 1992 Winter Olympics
Cross-country skiers at the 1994 Winter Olympics
Olympic medalists in cross-country skiing
FIS Nordic World Ski Championships medalists in cross-country skiing
Medalists at the 1992 Winter Olympics
Olympic cross-country skiers of Finland
Olympic gold medalists for Finland
Olympic silver medalists for Finland
Sportspeople from Uusimaa
20th-century Finnish women